The Moskalyev SAM-13 (Russian: Москалев САМ-13) was a prototype twin-engined single-seat low-wing fighter built in the Soviet Union in the 1930s.

Design and development
The design of the SAM-13 followed similar principles to that of the Fokker D.XXIII: to build a lightweight twin-engined fighter with benign single-engined flying characteristics. Moskalyev's design could well have been influenced directly by the D.XXIII, which had been exhibited at the 1938 Paris Salon, differing mainly in size.

The SAM-13 was built largely from wood, with steel fittings in high stress areas and welded steel-tube engine mounts. It was powered by two  Voronezh MV-6 6-cylinder, air-cooled, inverted in-line engines mounted at the front and rear of the fuselage nacelle, driving 2-bladed, variable pitch propellers.

The sharply tapered wings supported tail-booms which in turn supported the tailplane, elevators, single centrally-mounted fin and rudder. The wings also housed the retractable main undercarriage units which retracted inwards. The nose undercarriage was attached to the front engine mounting and retracted rearwards.

Armament of the SAM-13 was intended to be 4x  ShKAS machine-guns: two in the fuselage top decking firing through the propeller disc, and one at each end of the wing centre-section.

Operational history
First flown in 1940 by Nikolay D Fikson, the SAM-13 proved difficult to handle, requiring long runs to take off and land, with poor climb performance and low ceiling.

After the first flight and subsequent tests, the poor flying qualities of the SAM-13 were being addressed when the Germans invaded during Operation Barbarossa. By Spring 1941 the SAM-13 was undergoing tests at LII, piloted by Mark L Gallai, even being entered for a summer air race. All flying ceased after the German invasion, which prompted destruction of the aircraft.

Specifications (SAM-13)

References

Further reading

External links 

SAM-13 at Ctrl-c.liu.se
SAM-13 at Valka.cz (In English)
SAM-13 at Airwar.ru (In Russian)

Moskalyev aircraft

Low-wing aircraft
Twin-engined push-pull aircraft
Aircraft first flown in 1940
Abandoned military aircraft projects of the Soviet Union